Mpumi Mpofu is the South African Secretary of Defence, and former director general of transport.

References

South African politicians
Year of birth missing (living people)
Living people
Place of birth missing (living people)